Arthur Payne (born 28 August 1923) is an Australian former international speedway rider who finished fifth in the 1952 Speedway World Championship final.

Life and career
Payne arrived in the United Kingdom in 1947 and signed up with the Tamworth Hounds in the National League Division Three. After scoring almost three hundred points for the Hounds, he was transferred to the Birmingham Brummies for £500, a record fee for a third division rider at that time.

Payne struck up an excellent partnership with Brummies captain Stan Dell and the Brummies were promoted from National League Division Two at the end of the 1948 season. In 1949, with the Brummies in National League Division One, Payne had ridden in all three divisions within the first three years of his career. 

It was with the Brummies his career flourished, reaching the World Final three times in four years, finishing fifth in his second appearance.

In September 2015, it was noted that Payne, aged 91, was living in the Hervey Bay area of Queensland, and still regularly played golf.

World final appearances
 1950 -  London, Wembley Stadium - 16th - 0pts
 1952 -  London, Wembley Stadium - 5th - 9pts
 1953 -  London, Wembley Stadium - Res - Did Not Ride

References

1923 births
Living people
Australian expatriates in the United Kingdom
Australian speedway riders
Birmingham Brummies riders
Racing drivers from Sydney